Frank Farian (born Franz Reuther; 18 July 1941) is a German record producer, musician, singer and songwriter, who founded the 1970s disco-pop group Boney M., the Latin pop band No Mercy and the pop band Milli Vanilli. He frequently created vocal groups in which the publicised members merely lip-synced to songs sung by session members. He owns the record label MCI and several subsidiaries. Over the course of his career, Farian has sold over 850 million records and earned 800 gold and platinum certifications.

Career 
Farian started as a trained cook before moving into the music industry. In April 1967, he released a cover of Otis Redding's "Mr. Pitiful" under the name "Frankie Farian". In 1976, Farian's German-language cover of Dickey Lee's "Rocky" stayed at No. 1 for four weeks and received gold certification.

Boney M. 
In the early days of his career, he was keen to attain success as a solo artist, but made little impact on the popular music scene until his song "Baby Do You Wanna Bump" (a remake of Prince Buster's song "Al Capone" from 1967), released under the pseudonym Boney M., became successful. He recruited a line-up which included vocalists Liz Mitchell and Marcia Barrett along with a male, Bobby Farrell, and female dancer, Maizie Williams, and his own additional vocals. Under the name Boney M, he achieved his biggest success in Europe as well as across the whole world with well-known songs, like "Daddy Cool", "Rivers of Babylon", "Rasputin" and a remake of "Mary's Boy Child".

Far Corporation 
Farian also started the supergroup Far Corporation (named after the first syllable of his last name), which featured Steve Lukather, David Paich, Bobby Kimball, Simon Phillips (all from Toto fame) and Robin McAuley. Far Corporation were the first act to chart with a cover version of Led Zeppelin's "Stairway to Heaven"; their cover was a top 10 hit in the UK, reaching number 8 in October 1985.

Meat Loaf 
In 1986, Farian produced and mixed the Meat Loaf album Blind Before I Stop. He also sang backing vocals on the first single from the album Rock 'n' Roll Mercenaries, which was credited to Meat Loaf featuring John Parr.

Milli Vanilli 

On 14 November 1990, Farian confessed to orchestrating the events leading to the Milli Vanilli scandal. As a producer, he  assembled a group of session musicians and fronted it with physically attractive dancers Robert Pilatus and Fabrice Morvan. Following a 1989 performance where a backing track error first revealed the singers had been lip-syncing, Farian later confirmed to the press that others had sung on the albums. Milli Vanilli's 1990 Grammy Award for Best New Artist was revoked, and at least 27 lawsuits were filed in the United States under U.S. consumer fraud protection laws.

La Bouche, Le Click, Eruption, No Mercy 
Following the Milli Vanilli controversy, Farian developed similar Eurodance groups La Bouche and Le Click. He also produced the 1997 version of "Tic, Tic Tac" by Chilli Feat. Carrapicho.

Some other groups Farian has been involved with are Eruption (whom he managed in 1977), singer Precious Wilson and Latin pop band No Mercy based in Germany.

Daddy Cool musical 
On 15 August 2006, the musical Daddy Cool opened at the Shaftesbury Theatre in London's West End, featuring Michelle Collins, Michael Harvey, Javine Hylton and singer/songwriter Darvina Plante. The £3 million show was produced by Farian and Robert Mackintosh. The story, written by Stephen Plaice with Amani Naphtali, is predominantly based on the songs of Boney M., but also features songs by Milli Vanilli and No Mercy. A second show opened 23 April 2007 in Berlin, Germany, and toured in the Netherlands from August 2011 to February 2012, Spain (Palma de Mallorca) in July 2012, Switzerland from November 2015 to January 2016, and Germany 2016.

Other activities 
In 2006, Farian was credited as co-writing the song "Doin' Fine" with British producers Nathan Thomas and Carl M. Cox. (Other writers involved in the song were Chris Rudall, Baz Qureshi, Peter Wilson, Chris Richards and George Reyam.) Described as paying tribute to the 'sound' of Boney M., the song was essentially a new composition featuring the string arrangement from Boney M.'s 1976 number one hit "Daddy Cool". It was recorded by Australian pop singer Peter Wilson. It was initially released in the UK on 16 April 2007 in its extended format, entitled "Daddy's Cool 12" Mix", and reached number one on the EuroDanceHits EuroNRG Top 40 in May 2007. The original version of "Doin' Fine" was featured on Peter Wilson's debut album, Follow Me, released in the UK on 8 October 2007. It was also recorded in 2008 by Amanda Lear.

Personal life 
Farian resides in Miami, Florida, US. He has a daughter born in 1980 from his first marriage. His daughter Yanina was born to his then girlfriend Chinya. Yanina sang with her father in 2021 on a cover of "Cherish" by Kool & the Gang.

Discography

Studio albums 
 So ein Tag (1971)
 So muß Liebe sein (1973)
 Rocky (1976)
 Division One (1985)
 Solitude (1994)

Compilations 
 Star Discothek (1978)
 The Hit Man – The Best of 25 Years (1994)
 The Hit Collection – The Best of 25 Years (1994)
 The Hit Man II (2000)
 Summer Hits (2001)
 Dieter Thomas Heck präsentiert: 40 Jahre ZDF Hitparade (2009)
 Produced by Frank Farian (2009)

Singles 
 "Shouting Ghost" (1964)
 "Yakety Yak" (1964)
 "Under the Boardwalk" (1965)
 "Mr. Pitiful" (1967)
 "Gipsy" (1968)
 "Dana My Love" (1968)
 "Ein Kissen voller Träume" (1969)
 "Speedy Jack" (1970)
 "Du bist wunderbar" (1971)
 "Morgens, mittags, abends – Barbara" (1971)
 "So ein Tag" (1971)
 "Gold in Acapulco" (1972)
 "Leg den Kopf an meine Schulter" (1972)
 "Was kann schöner sein" (1973)
 "So muß Liebe sein" (1973)
 "Wunderbar" (1973)
 "Bleib bei mir" (1974)
 "An mir soll es nicht liegen" (1974)
 "Atlantica" (1975)
 "My Decision" (1975)
 "Cara mia bleib" (1975)
 "Rocky" (1976)
 "Spring über deinen Schatten, Tommy" (1976)
 "Sie war erst 17 (und neu in der Stadt)" (1977)
 "Mother and Child Reunion" (1985)
 "Stairway to Heaven" (1985)
 "Fire and Water" (1986)
 "You Are the Woman" (1986)
 "One By One" (1987)
 "Sebastian" (1987)
 "Rikki Don't Lose That Number" (1994)
 "Rainy Days" (1994)

Albums produced (selection) 
Boney M.

Take the Heat off Me (No. 2 Germany, No. 1 Sweden)
Love for Sale (No. 1 Germany, No. 1 Sweden, No. 2 Netherlands)
Nightflight to Venus (No. 1 UK, No. 1 Germany, No. 1 Netherlands)
Oceans of Fantasy (No. 1 UK, No. 1 Germany, No. 3 Netherlands)
The Magic of Boney M. – 20 Golden Hits (No. 1 UK, No. 2 Germany, No. 2 New Zealand)
Gold – 20 Super Hits (No. 2 Netherlands, No. 2 New Zealand)

Gilla
 Help! Help!  (1977)
Meat Loaf
Blind Before I Stop (1986) (No. 28 UK, No. 21 Switzerland, No. 51 Germany)
Milli Vanilli

All or Nothing (1988) (No. 4 Germany, No. 1 Australia, No. 1 New Zealand)
Girl You Know It's True (1989) (No. 1 USA, No. 1 Canada)
La Bouche
Sweet Dreams (1995) (No. 2 Finland, No. 2 Switzerland, No. 10 Australia)
No Mercy
My Promise (1996) (No. 4 Australia, No. 3 Netherlands)
Eruption
Eruption, also released as I Can't Stand The Rain (1977)
Leave A Light (1979)
Precious Wilson
On the Race Track (1980)
All Coloured in Love (1982)
Funky Fingers (1983)

References

External links 
 Official website
 Daddy Cool Kids – Official website
 Musical Daddy Cool – Official website
 ZZ Queen – Official website
 - FFFclub website

1941 births
20th-century hoaxes
Boney M.
Entertainment scandals
German expatriates in the United States
German male singers
German music managers
German pop singers
German record producers
German songwriters
Hansa Records artists
Living people
Milli Vanilli
Musical hoaxes
People from Bad Kreuznach (district)